Duca Leindecker (born April 5, 1970) is a Brazilian singer, composer, multi-instrumentalist and writer, leader of the band Cidadão Quem. From 2008 to 2012 he formed Pouca Vogal, with Humberto Gessinger.

Personal life 

Born in Porto Alegre in 1970, he began playing various instruments, and at when he was seventeen years old he recorded his first solo album and, in the early 1990s, was invited by Bob Dylan to open his shows in Brazil. He recorded seven CDs with the Cidadão Quem group and participated to Rock in Rio III. He is the author of themes for telenovelas.

From 2008 to 2012 Duca dedicated himself to the duo Pouca Vogal, with Humberto Gessinger, leading to the release of two albums. In 2015 he released his first solo DVD, Plano Aberto, and in 2018 he launched Download Armas.

Private life 

From 2001 to 2012 he was married to actress Ingra Liberato, with whom he had his first child, Guilherme, born on July 11, 2003, in Rio de Janeiro. In the same year of their separation, he married the journalist and politician Manuela d'Ávila. The couple's daughter, Laura, was born on August 28, 2015, in Porto Alegre.

Discography

Bandaliera 
 Nosso Lado Animal (1987)
 Ao Vivo (1991)

Solo 
 Duca Leindecker (1988)
 Voz, Violão e Batucada (2013)
 Plano Aberto (2015)
 Baixar Armas (2018)

Cidadão Quem 
 Outras Caras (1993)
 A lente azul (1996)
 Spermatozoon (1999)
 Soma (2000)
 Girassóis da Rússia (2002)
 Acústico no Theatro São Pedro (2004)
 7 (2007)

Pouca Vogal 
 Pouca Vogal: Gessinger + Leindecker (2008)
 Ao Vivo Em Porto Alegre (2009)

Books
Duca Leindecker wrote:

 A casa da esquina (1999)
 A favor do vento (2002)
 O menino que pintava sonhos (2013)

References

External links 

1970 births
Brazilian male guitarists
Brazilian rock musicians
Brazilian writers
Living people
People from Porto Alegre
20th-century Brazilian male singers
20th-century Brazilian singers
21st-century Brazilian male singers
21st-century Brazilian singers
Brazilian singer-songwriters
Música Popular Brasileira guitarists
Música Popular Brasileira singers